The 2009 season is the 87th season of competitive football in Ecuador.

National leagues

Serie A

Champion: Deportivo Quito (4th title)
Runner-up: Deportivo Cuenca
International cup qualifiers:
2009 Copa Sudamericana: Emelec, LDU Quito
2010 Copa Libertadores: Deportivo Quito, Deportivo Cuenca, Emelec
Relegated: LDU Portoviejo, Técnico Universitario

Serie B
Winner: Independiente José Terán (1st title)
Runner-up: Universidad Católica
Promoted: Universidad Católica, Independiente José Terán
Relegated: Aucas

Segunda
Winner: UT Cotopaxi (1st title)
Runner-up: River Plate
Promoted: River Plate, UT Cotopaxi, Universidad Técnica Equinoccial

Clubs in international competitions

National team

Senior team

2010 FIFA World Cup qualifiers

The senior team finished all their qualifying games this year. They failed to qualify to their third successive FIFA World Cup.

Friendlies

Note: This is an unofficial international friendly.

Under-20 team
The under-20 team participated in the 2009 South American Youth Championship in Venezuela. They were eliminated by coin toss.

Under-17 team
The 2009 South American Under-17 Football Championship was held in Chile, in which Ecuador's U-17 team participated. They were drawn into Group B, from which they managed to advance to the Final Group. They failed to qualified to the 2009 FIFA U-17 World Cup in Nigeria.
Group B matches

Final Group matches

External links
Official website of the Ecuadorian football federation  
2009 season on RSSSF

 
2009